Galan  is a town located in the Akaki district of the Oromia Special Zone Surrounding Finfine and 25 km South East from Addis Ababa Addis Ababa-Adama highway crossing galan town.

In 2020 it attracted attention for being the site of the murder of Oromo musician Hachalu Hundessa, whose death sparked a series of intense rioting across Oromia.

See also 

 Districts in the Oromia Region

References 

Cities and towns in Oromia Region